The 2018 United States Senate election in Utah took place on November 6, 2018, to elect a member of the United States Senate to represent the State of Utah, concurrently with other elections to the United States Senate, elections to the United States House of Representatives, and various state and local elections. The primaries took place on June 26.

Incumbent Republican senator Orrin Hatch announced in January 2018 that he would retire and not seek reelection to an eighth term, making this the first open seat U.S. Senate election in Utah since 1992 and the first in this seat since 1905. The general election was won by Mitt Romney, who had been the Republican nominee for president in 2012 and previously was the 70th Governor of Massachusetts from 2003 to 2007. Romney became only the third person in American history to be elected governor and U.S. senator in different states, and the first former major party presidential nominee to run for a new office since Walter Mondale in 2002.

Background

Process
Utah's 2018 U.S. Senate candidates had dual routes toward placement on the primary election ballot: (1) eligibility via win or second-place showings at a convention of delegates selected from party local caucuses; and/or (2) eligibility via obtaining sufficient petition signatures.

Taking the traditional route, the top two candidates for the U.S. Senate at any of the party state conventions (to be held this year the latter part of April) will be placed on the June 26 primary election ballot. Also, any candidate who collects 28,000 ballot-access petition signatures will be placed on the primary ballot.

If no competitor will have achieved the above-mentioned alternate access to the primary ballot through collected signatures and a convention winner had achieved sixty-percent of delegate votes, this candidate straightaway receives his or her party's nomination solely via the older-style caucuses-convention system. Otherwise, a candidate will be nominated through receiving a plurality of votes in the primary election and thereby advance to the November general election.

Incumbent Orrin Hatch did not seek reelection.

Hatch to retire
Incumbent Republican U.S. Senator Orrin Hatch was reelected to a seventh term in 2012.  During his 2012 reelection campaign, Hatch had pledged that if he were elected that it would be his last term. Hatch won his first election in 1976 in part by criticizing the incumbent's 18-year tenure. Hatch initially announced a re-election campaign on March 9, 2017, though he also said at that time that he might withdraw from the race if Mitt Romney decided to run. An August 19–21, 2016, poll conducted by Public Policy Polling found only 19% of voters wanted Hatch to run in 2018, while 71% wanted him to retire. On October 27, 2017, Hatch reportedly told friends privately that he was going to retire in 2019 and on January 2, 2018, made a public announcement of his plans to retire at the end of his current term in January 2019.

Republican primary

Convention

Candidates

Nominee
 Mitt Romney, former Governor of Massachusetts, Republican nominee for President of the United States in 2012, and Republican nominee for U.S. Senate in Massachusetts in 1994

Eliminated in the primary election
 Mike Kennedy, state representative

Eliminated at Convention
 Loy Brunson
 Alicia Colvin
 Stoney Fonua, tax accountant
 Chris Forbush, attorney and candidate for the Nevada State Assembly in 2016
 Jeremy Friedbaum
 Timothy Adrian Jimenez, engineer
 Joshua Lee
 Larry Michael Meyers, attorney
 Gayle Painter
 Samuel Parker

Declined
 Rob Bishop, U.S Representative
 Jason Chaffetz, former U.S. Representative
 Orrin Hatch, incumbent U.S. Senator and President pro tempore of the United States Senate
 Boyd Matheson, former Chief of Staff for Senator Mike Lee
 Mia Love, U.S. Representative (Endorsed Mitt Romney)
 Evan McMullin, former congressional staffer, former CIA agent and independent candidate for President of the United States in 2016 (Endorsed Mitt Romney)
 John Curtis, U.S. Representative

Endorsements

Results

Primary

Debates

Polling 

with Orrin Hatch

Endorsements

Results

Democratic primary

Candidates

Declared
 Jenny Wilson, Salt Lake County Councilwoman and candidate for Mayor of Salt Lake City in 2007

Eliminated at Convention
 Mitchell Kent Vice, businessman

Withdrew
 James Singer, Salt Lake Community College, Westminster College adjunct professor & Candidate For UT-03
 Danny Drew, director of adult education for the Duchesne County School District

Declined
 Ben McAdams, Mayor of Salt Lake County (running for UT-04)

Endorsements

Libertarian Party

Candidates

Declared
 Craig Bowden, veteran and businessman

Constitution Party

Candidates

Declared
 Tim Aalders

Independent American Party

Candidates

Declared
 Reed McCandless

General election

Candidates
 Ryan Daniel Jackson (I, write-in)
 Abe Korb (I, write-in)
 Caleb Dan Reeve (I, write-in)

Debates

Predictions

^Highest rating given

Endorsements

Polling
Graphical summary

Notes

with Mike Kennedy

with Orrin Hatch

with Chris Stewart

with Matt Holland

Results

References

External links
Candidates at Vote Smart
Candidates at Ballotpedia
Campaign finance at FEC
Campaign finance at OpenSecrets

Official campaign websites
Tim Aalders (C) for Senate
Craig Bowden (L) for Senate
Reed C. McCandless (IAP) for Senate 
Caleb Reeve (I) for Senate (Write-in)
Mitt Romney (R) for Senate
Jenny Wilson (D) for Senate

2018
Utah
United States Senate
Mitt Romney